Pana Wina Island is an island of Papua New Guinea.  It is part of the Calvados Chain, a grouping of islands within the Louisiade Archipelago.  Pana Wina is the largest island in the Calvados Chain, and lies near the eastern end of the chain, just west of Hemenahei Island.  The very small Yakimoan Island lies just west of Pana Wina.
The capital village of the Calvados Chain, where the ward's school is located, Bomalou, with a population of just over 300, lies on the western shore of the island.

References

Islands of Milne Bay Province
Louisiade Archipelago